Natalie Van Coevorden (born 22 December 1992 in Campbelltown, New South Wales) is an Australian triathlete. Currently she is ranked 24th in the World Triathlon Series, and is number 1 in Oceania.

Early life and career
Van Coevorden was born and grew up in Campbelltown, New South Wales, doing both swimming and cross country running throughout her years at John Therry Catholic High School. During her youth, she swam nine times a week. In 2009 she began triathlon and placed 4th at the Australian National Schools Triathlon in 2010. It was here that she was scouted by her coach Jamie Turner and began training full-time for triathlon, splitting her time between her training base in Wollongong, Australia and Vitoria, Spain. Prior to meeting Turner, she had completed only one triathlon, for which she had no structured training.

In 2012, Van Coevorden competed in her first World Triathlon Series race in Sydney, and has completed many races on the ITU circuit since. In 2013, she gained her first podium on the ITU circuit at the Tongyeong World Cup where she placed 3rd. In 2018, she gained her first WTS medal in Abu Dhabi, placing 3rd. That same year, she stated that "[competing in the] Olympics is now a realistic goal for me – my ultimate goal…my dream". 2019 saw her earn a bronze medal for Australia at the ITU Triathlon Mixed Relay World Championship in Hamburg; alongside Aaron Royle and Emma Jeffcoat.

References

External links 

 

Australian female triathletes
Living people
Olympic triathletes of Australia
1992 births
20th-century Australian women
21st-century Australian women
Commonwealth Games bronze medallists for Australia
Commonwealth Games medallists in triathlon
Triathletes at the 2022 Commonwealth Games
Sportswomen from New South Wales
Sportspeople from Sydney
Medallists at the 2022 Commonwealth Games